Lake Kucherla (Кучерлинское) is located in the Altai Mountains and Katun Nature Reserve of Siberia. Together with Lake Teletskoye, Belukha Mountain and the Ukok Plateau it forms a natural UNESCO World Heritage Site entitled "Golden Mountains of Altai".

The lake is popular with tourists and holds a stock of grayling.

External links

Golden Mountains of Altai, Word Heritage

Kucherla
Kucherla
Kucherla
Kucherla